Henry Ajomale is a Nigerian politician, technocrat and former Commissioner for Special Duties, Lagos State, Nigeria.
He is the immediate past chairman of the All Progressives Congress, Lagos State chapter.

References

People from Lagos State
Lagos State politicians
Yoruba politicians
Commissioners of ministries of Lagos State
Year of birth missing (living people)
Living people